Chaenostoma is a genus of crabs belonging to the family Macrophthalmidae.

The species of this genus are found in Africa, Australia and Southeastern Asia.

Species:
 Chaenostoma boscii (Audouin, 1826)
 Chaenostoma crassimanus Stimpson, 1858
 Chaenostoma java Naderloo, 2013
 Chaenostoma orientale Stimpson, 1858
 Chaenostoma punctulatus (Miers, 1884)
 Chaenostoma sinuspersici (Naderloo & Türkay, 2011)

References

Ocypodoidea
Decapod genera